Almazny (masculine), Almaznaya (feminine), or Almaznoye (neuter) may refer to:
Almazny Urban Settlement, a municipal formation into which the urban-type settlement of Almazny in Mirninsky District of the Sakha Republic, Russia is incorporated
Almazny, Russia (Almaznaya, Almaznoye), several inhabited localities in Russia
Sameh Almazny, engineering assistant who participated in the production of the Pandemonium album by the English rock group Killing Joke
Almaznaya, alternative name of Almazna, a town in Luhansk Oblast, Ukraine
Almaznaya, alternative name of Almazna coal mine in Donetsk Oblast, Ukraine